The Sprinter Lighttrain or SLT is an Electric Multiple Unit (EMU) train type operated by the Nederlandse Spoorwegen in the Netherlands. They were built from 2007 to 2012 by Bombardier (2400) and Siemens (2600). It is the successor of the Sprinter SGM train type.

Names
 Sprinter Lighttrain
 Sprinter
 SLT
 S70 or S100

General information

The SLT is designed to replace the Mat '64 trains from the 1960s and 1970s. The first 35 sets were ordered in 2005 and the first set, 2402 arrived in January 2008. The second set, 2602 arrived in February 2008 and both were used on test runs. In September 2007 NS ordered a further 64 sets, and these started arriving in the Netherlands in mid-2009. In 2009 a further 32 were ordered. The trains use regenerative braking, which can feed energy back into the contact wire when they brake.

The trains are based on the DB Class 425 design, but made to meet the demands of the Sprinter. They use Jacobs bogie, which allow for thin and wide gangways between each coach. The units were built in Aachen (2400) and Krefeld (2600).

Modernisation
From 2018 onwards, all units are being retrofitted with on-board toilets and a special sliding step for wheelchair users. The toilet retrofit is conducted at the Talbot Services GmbH workshops in Aachen; of which 2 units are in the workshops at any one time. The expectations are that these modernisations will be completed in 2021.

Use of Sprinter Lighttrains
The SLT is primarily for the Randstad area, around the four main cities (Amsterdam, Utrecht, The Hague and Rotterdam). They are used on stopping services, designed for routes where stations are close together and for this they feature many wide doors and fast acceleration.

After many test runs without passengers, they were put into service on 23 February 2009 between Den Haag Centraal - Gouda - Utrecht Centraal, two months later than planned. Passengers were happy with the comfort, no step between the train and the platform and the fresh interior, however the trains lack a toilet.

Problems occurred, especially when there was a four-car and a six-car unit coupled together, so the test was stopped temporarily on 1 May 2009. The test started again on 21 September 2009, outside of the peak hours. Again there were problems, and the delivery of sets was stopped for the time being.

With the December 2009 timetable change, sets were put in again between Utrecht and Den Haag, as well as between Gouda and Rotterdam. In February 2010, the delivery of new sets was restarted, with four sets arriving each week. In May 2010 SLT sets also began operating between Rotterdam Centraal and Hoek van Holland Strand and on 24 May 2010 also between Utrecht Centraal and Baarn via Soest.

In December 2010 more than 2/3 of the SLT's failed after snowfall, leaving the NS to revert to the old trains that had recently been stored out of services.

Services operated
The SLT's are regularly used on these services in the current timetable (2017). They can sometimes appear on other services.

Accidents and incidents

Three passengers were injured.
On 21 April 2012, unit 2658 was one of the two trains involved in a head-on collision near  station.

Gallery

References

Electric multiple units of the Netherlands
1500 V DC multiple units of the Netherlands
Siemens multiple units
Bombardier Transportation multiple units